Eddie "Chank" Willis (June 3, 1936 – August 20, 2018) was an American soul musician. Willis played electric guitar and occasional electric sitar for Motown's in-house studio band, The Funk Brothers, during the 1960s and early 1970s.

Career
Born in Grenada, Mississippi, Willis was known for his signature style of muted guitar riffs which added a distinctive tone or "color" to the beat, often timed with the snare, of the hundreds of hit songs recorded at Hitsville U.S.A. for Motown artists. Among the recordings Willis performed on are "Please Mr. Postman" by The Marvelettes, "The Way You Do the Things You Do" by The Temptations, "You Keep Me Hanging On" by The Supremes, and "I Was Made to Love Her" by Stevie Wonder.

Influences for Willis included Chet Atkins, Wes Montgomery, and Albert King. He played a Gibson Firebird guitar on most of his early 1960s work, later moving on to use a Gibson ES-335. On recordings such as The Supremes' "No Matter What Sign You Are", Willis performed on a Coral sitar.

He accepted an offer from Phil Collins to perform on his album of Motown and 1960s soul classics, Going Back.

Death
Willis died on August 20, 2018 in Gore Springs, Mississippi from complications of polio at the age of 82.

References

External links

1936 births
2018 deaths
African-American guitarists
American soul musicians
People from Grenada, Mississippi
The Funk Brothers members
American soul guitarists
American rhythm and blues guitarists
Sitar players
American session musicians
20th-century American guitarists
Guitarists from Michigan
Guitarists from Mississippi
Deaths from polio
20th-century African-American musicians
21st-century African-American people